The following is a list of the MTV Europe Music Award winners and nominees for Best Italian Act.

Winners and nominees
Winners are listed first and highlighted in bold.

1990s

2000s

2010s

2020s

See also 
 TRL Awards (Italy)

Notes
Local Hero Award — Italy
MTV Select — Southern
 Indicates an act which received the nomination after winning the pre-nominations round.

References

MTV Europe Music Awards
Italian music awards
Awards established in 1999